Poznanovci is a dispersed village in the Municipality of Puconci in the Prekmurje region of Slovenia.

There is a small Lutheran church in the settlement.

References

External links
Poznanovci on Geopedia

Populated places in the Municipality of Puconci